Cidade FM is a Portuguese radio station that focuses on international and national hits. Cidade targets the younger audience, 15-24.

Cidade is operated by the Portuguese radio division of German media giant Bauer Media Group, sister stations include: Rádio Comercial, Rádio Clube Português, Mix FM, Best Rock FM, Romântica FM, and M80.

It was launched as pirate radio station, Radio Cidade, on 1 April 1986 in Amadora by Brazilian immigrants Rui Duarte, Rui Duarte Júnior and Edson Yazejy before it was suspended on 24 December 1988 due to not having a legal licence. It became legal on 22 May 1989.

The station peaked its listenership in the mid-1990s when it became the second most listened radio station in Portugal, and soon expanded to several stations in Greater Lisbon, Greater Porto, Coimbra, Vale de Cambra , Santarém, Alentejo and Algarve, forming the Rede Cidade group.

Rede Cidade was bought by Media Capital in 1999 and changed its name to Cidade FM in late 2003 before being rebranded as Cidade in 2014. In June 2018 the radio station started to name itself Cidade FM again, while in February 2022, Media Capital sold their radio unit to Bauer Media Group.

FM frequencies 
 Cidade 91.6 Lisbon
 Cidade 107.2 Gaia (Porto)
 Cidade 99.7 Penacova (Coimbra)
 Cidade Ribatejo 99.3 Alcanena (Santarém)
 Cidade Viseu 102.8 Viseu
 Cidade Vale de Cambra 101.0 Vale de Cambra (Aveiro)
 Cidade Tejo 106.2 Montijo (Setúbal)
 Cidade Minho 104.4 Amares (Braga)
 Cidade Alentejo 97.2 Redondo (Évora)
 Cidade Algarve 99.7 Loulé (Faro)

Hosts/DJs 
João Paulo Sousa, Tecas (Inês Silva), Yolanda Tati, Gonçalo Roque, Inês Carvalho, Diogo Serra, Diogo Sena, Artur Simões, Inês Queiroga, Laura Ferreira 

Weekdays
 Já São Horas- ( João Paulo Sousa e Tecas)- das 7h às 11
 Yolanda Tati com o estagiário Helder Tavares (11h-15h)
 Laura Ferreira- 15 às 18h 

TOQUE DE SAÍDA- Laura Ferreira, Artur Simões, Inês Queiroga e Diogo Sena-  das 18h as 19h 

TURNO DA NOITE-  Artur Simões, Inês Queiroga e Diogo Sena

Saturday
Flaviana Borges - 7h às 11h 
Yolanda Tati- 11h as 15h
Gonçalo Roque- 15h às 19h   
TURNO DA NOITE-  Artur Simões, Inês Queiroga e Diogo Sena- 19h às 22h

Sunday

Mafalda Domingues- 7h às 11h
Yolanda Tati- 11h as 15h
Gonçalo Roque- 15h às 19h   
TURNO DA NOITE-  Artur Simões, Inês Queiroga e Diogo Sena- 19h às 22h

Before that, at 22h to 00h, there was 2hrs of pop, called SLOW JAMS, the Host was YOLANDA TATI

External links 
 Official Station Website

Radio stations in Portugal
Radio stations established in 1986
1986 establishments in Portugal